Christopher Gist (1706–1759) was an explorer, surveyor, and frontiersman active in Colonial America. He was one of the first white explorers of the Ohio Country (the present-day states of Ohio, eastern Indiana, western Pennsylvania, and northwestern West Virginia). Gist is credited with providing the first detailed description of the Ohio Country to colonists in the Thirteen Colonies. At the outbreak of the French and Indian War, Gist accompanied Colonel George Washington on missions into this wilderness and saved Washington's life on two occasions.

Early life
Born during 1706 in Baltimore, Maryland, Gist is thought to have had little formal education. Historians believe that he received training as a surveyor, more than likely from his father Richard Gist, who helped plot the city of Baltimore. Gist's nephew Mordecai Gist served as a general commanded by Washington during the Revolution.

Family
Gist married Sarah Howard, a daughter of Joshua Howard of Manchester. Howard served with King James II of England's forces as an officer during the Monmouth Rebellion during 1685, before settling in Baltimore, Maryland. The couple had three sons, Richard (1727–1780) who was killed at the Battle of King's Mountain, Nathaniel who commanded Gist's Additional Continental Regiment of the Continental Army, and Thomas. Christopher's brother Nathaniel Gist married Sarah's sister Mary Howard, and also partnered with Washington and two other veteran soldiers on a prospective land deal during the mid-1750s. The couple also had two daughters, Anne and Violet. Nathaniel might have been the father of Sequoyah, the creator of the Cherokee syllabary.

Frontiersman career

By 1750 Gist had settled in northern North Carolina, near the Yadkin River. One of his neighbors was the noted frontiersman Daniel Boone. During that same year, the Ohio Company hired Gist, for £150, to explore the country of the Ohio River as far as the present-day Louisville, Kentucky area, and endear himself to the Native Americans along the way. He was in Muskingum on Christmas Day of 1750 where he celebrated with some local indigenous people a religious ceremony with readings from the Church of England. This is believed to be the first Protestant religious service in the present state of Ohio. That winter Gist mapped the Ohio countryside between the Lenape (Delaware) village of Shannopin's Town, site of present-day Pittsburgh, to the Great Miami River in present-day western Ohio. Gist was received well at Pickawillany when he arrived during February 1751, and strengthened the alliance between the Native American chief Memeskia and British interests against the expanding French colonies. From there he crossed into Kentucky accompanied by a black servant and returned to his home along the Yadkin.

When Gist returned to North Carolina, he found that his family had fled to Roanoke, Virginia, because of Indian attacks. He rejoined them. During the summer of 1751 he again went west to explore the Pennsylvania and western Virginia (present day West Virginia), country south of the Ohio River.

During 1753 Gist again returned to the Ohio Country, this time accompanying George Washington. Robert Dinwiddie, the governor of Virginia, sent Washington to Fort Le Boeuf to deliver a message to the French demanding they leave the Ohio Country. (The French were constructing forts in the Ohio Country to prevent the Thirteen Colonies from expanding there; they ignored Dinwiddie's letter.)  Washington took (now  Lieutenant) Gist along as his guide. They traveled on the Venango Path through the Ohio Country, stopping at Logstown on their way to the fort. During the trip, Gist earned his place in history by twice saving the young Washington's life: first, from an attempted assault by a hostile Native American; and, second, by pulling Washington from the freezing Allegheny River after Washington had fallen off of a makeshift raft.

French and Indian War service
During 1754, Washington, Gist, and a detachment of the Virginia Regiment attempted to drive the French from the region. At the Battle of Fort Necessity on July 3, 1754, the French army routed the Virginia militia. This was the beginning of the French and Indian War, a part of the Seven Years' War between France and Britain. Gist owned land near the present city of Uniontown, Pennsylvania. He named it Gist's Plantation and began to build a town there. At the outset of the war, the French burned all the buildings. Gist was a member of the Braddock Expedition during 1755 when it was defeated by the French and their Native American allies. In May, 1756, Gist and elements of the 1st Virginia Regiment, 17th Company 'Rangers' accompanied Thomas Cresap on a retaliatory strike against Indian attacks. That military action originated at Fort Cumberland, but had to make a fighting retreat after being ambushed. Details of the action and Gist's role in it were printed in the June 17, 1756 issue of the Pennsylvania Gazette.  After the defeat, Gist traveled into Tennessee, where he met with various native groups to seek their help during the war.  His whereabouts, during the final years of the war, were uncertain.

Death
It is said that, during the summer of 1759, Gist contracted smallpox and died in South Carolina or Georgia. Gist's pay for military service with the First Virginia Regiment was paid to his heir, Nathaniel Gist, by 1766. Other reports have him surviving until 1794 and dying in Cumberland, North Carolina (although this narrative may confuse Christopher son of Richard Gist with a nephew also named Christopher Gist, one of Richard's grandsons through Nathaniel Gist and Mary Howard.

See also
Fort Seybert

References

1706 births
1759 deaths
Colonial American Indian agents
Deaths from smallpox
People of Maryland in the French and Indian War
People of colonial Maryland
People of colonial North Carolina
People from Baltimore